The Rolls-Royce/JAEC RJ500 was a  civil turbofan which Rolls-Royce and the Japanese Aero Engine Corporation (JAEC) consortium hoped to develop for aircraft like the Boeing 737-300 and the McDonnell Douglas MD-80.

A single-stage fan, driven by a three-stage LP turbine, supercharged the nine-stage HP compressor, which was driven by a two-stage air-cooled HP turbine. The combustor was annular and the exhaust separate jets. The HP compressor was based on a scale-up of the Rolls-Royce RB401 HP compressor, with a ninth stage added at the rear. Even then, the engine nacelle required an oblate shape so as to improve ground clearance.

Although two prototype engines were built and ground tested, the project was cancelled in the early 1980s.

Specifications (RJ500)

See also

References
Notes

Bibliography
 
 Gunston, Bill. Rolls-Royce Aero Engines. Cambridge, England. Patrick Stephens Limited, 1989. 

1980s turbofan engines